The FX-601P and FX-602P were programmable calculators, manufactured by Casio from 1981. It was the successor model to the Casio FX-502P series and was itself succeeded in 1990 by the Casio FX-603P.

Display
The FX-601P series featured a single line dot matrix display with 11 characters as main display. An additional 3 digits 7-segment display used to display exponents as well as program steps when entering or debugging programs. There were 11 status indicators.

Programming
The programming model employed key stroke programming by which each key pressed was recorded and later played back. On record, multiple key presses were merged into a single programming step. Only a few operations needed two bytes. Synthetic programming was possible but not very common

The FX-601P could store 128 fully merged steps and data could be stored in 11 memory register. The memory of the FX-602P could be partitioned  between from 32 to 512 fully merged steps and data could be stored in 22 to 88 memory register. The default set-up was 22 register and 512 steps. From there one could trade 8 steps for one additional register or 80 steps for 11 register with the 11th register begin a so-called "F" register.

Like its predecessor the FX-602P series supported 10 labels for programs and subroutines called P0 .. P9. Each program or subroutine could have up to 10 local labels called LBL0 .. LBL9 for jumps and branches.

The FX-601P and FX-602P supported indirect addressing both for memory access and jumps and therefore  programming model could be considered Turing complete.

Both the FX-601P and FX-602P  could load and execute programs from the predecessors.

Programming example
This program computes the factorial of an integer number from 2 to 69. For 5!, the user enters 5 P0 to produce the result, 120. The program occupies 9 bytes of memory.

Interface

The FX-601P and FX-602P used the same FA-1 interface as used by the FX-502P line of calculators or alternatively the newer FA-2 interface which was also used by Casio FX-702P. Both interfaces featured a Kansas City standard Compact Cassette interface.

The FA-2 Interface was used the FX-602P series of programmable calculator and the FX-702P Pocket Computer  to store programs and data register to Compact Cassette. When compared with its predecessor the Casio FA-1 the FA-2 featured an additional tape control output and connector for the Casio FP-10 printer.

References

External links
 FX-602P home page with in depth information and home of the FX-602P Simulator.
 FX-602P Sim a simulator for the iPhone and iPod touch.
 The Casio FX-602P calculator on the pocket computer museum
 Casio FX-602P on Caz Pocket Computers Collection
 FX-601P and FX-602P on RS-Key maintained by Viktor Toth.
 casio fx-602p on Voidware
 FX-601P  and FX-602P ledudu's web page

FX-602P
Products introduced in 1981